Frutos Feo Pérez (born 1 January 1972 in El Perdigón, Province of Zamora) is a retired Spanish sprinter who specialized in the 100 metres.

He finished seventh in 4 x 100 metres relay at the 1997 World Championships, together with teammates Venancio José, Jordi Mayoral and Carlos Berlanga.

His personal best time is 10.22 seconds, achieved in July 1996 in Monachil.

References

1972 births
Living people
Sportspeople from the Province of Zamora
Spanish male sprinters
Athletes (track and field) at the 1996 Summer Olympics
Olympic athletes of Spain
Mediterranean Games silver medalists for Spain
Mediterranean Games medalists in athletics
Athletes (track and field) at the 1997 Mediterranean Games
20th-century Spanish people